Guy Lucien Michel Landel (born 7 July 1990) is a Guinean footballer who plays as a midfielder for Turkish club Boluspor.

Career statistics

International goals

Scores and results list Guinea's goal tally first.

References

External links
Player Profile at SO Foot

1990 births
Sportspeople from Conakry
Living people
Guinean footballers
Guinea international footballers
Association football midfielders
Le Mans FC players
Orduspor footballers
Gençlerbirliği S.K. footballers
Alanyaspor footballers
Giresunspor footballers
Bandırmaspor footballers
Boluspor footballers
Ligue 1 players
Ligue 2 players
Süper Lig players
TFF First League players
2015 Africa Cup of Nations players
Guinean expatriate footballers
Expatriate footballers in France
Expatriate footballers in Turkey
Guinean expatriate sportspeople in France
Guinean expatriate sportspeople in Turkey